Vanessa is a British talk show presented by Vanessa Feltz, which was broadcast on ITV from 1994 to 1998. Feltz moved to the BBC the following year where she presented The Vanessa Show, a morning and prime-time show of a similar format. The show was replaced by Trisha.

References

External links

1994 British television series debuts
1998 British television series endings
1990s British television talk shows
ITV talk shows
Television series by ITV Studios
Television shows produced by Anglia Television
English-language television shows